Petar Georgijevski (born 16 May 1960 in Yugoslavia) is a Macedonian retired football player. He capped once for Yugoslavia.

International career
He made his senior debut for Yugoslavia in a September 1984 friendly match away against Scotland, coming on as a second-half substitute for Darko Pančev. It proved to be his sole international appearance.

References

External links
 
Profile on Serbian federation official site

1960 births
Living people
Sportspeople from Bitola
Association football midfielders
Yugoslav footballers
Yugoslavia international footballers
Macedonian footballers
FK Vardar players
FC Gueugnon players
Yugoslav First League players
Ligue 2 players
Macedonian expatriate footballers
Expatriate footballers in France
Macedonian expatriate sportspeople in France